KNFT-FM (102.9 FM) is a radio station broadcasting a Country music format. Licensed to Bayard, New Mexico, United States, the station is currently owned by Skywest Licenses New Mexico LLC.

References

External links
 

Country radio stations in the United States
NFT-FM
Radio stations established in 1982
1982 establishments in New Mexico